Phassus costaricensis is a moth of the family Hepialidae first described by Herbert Druce in 1887. It is known from Costa Rica, from which its species epithet is derived.

References

Moths described in 1887
Hepialidae